Hosni Mubarak (1928–2020) was an Egyptian military and political leader who was President of Egypt from 1981 to 2011.

Mubarak may also refer to:
 Mubarak (name), an Arabic given name and surname
 Eid Mubarak, a traditional Muslim greeting
 Mubarak port, a controversial port scheduled to be built in Kuwait
 Mubarak, Iran (disambiguation)

See also
 Mobarak (disambiguation)
 Barak (disambiguation)
 Barak (given name)
 Barakah
 Baraka (disambiguation)